Scott Brick (born January 30, 1966 in Santa Barbara, California) is an American actor, writer and award-winning narrator of over 800 audiobooks, including popular titles such as Washington: A Life, Moneyball, Cloud Atlas, A Princess of Mars, The Bourne Identity, The Bourne Supremacy, The Bourne Ultimatum, Atlas Shrugged, Sideways, Do Androids Dream of Electric Sheep? (filmed as Blade Runner), I, Robot, Mystic River, Helter Skelter, Patriot Games, Bid Time Return (filmed as Somewhere in Time), In Cold Blood, the Dune series, Ender's Game, and Fahrenheit 451. He has narrated works for a number of high-profile authors, including Tom Clancy, Robert Ludlum, Michael Crichton, John Grisham, Clive Cussler, Stephen J. Cannell, William Faulkner, Nelson DeMille, Brad Meltzer, Harlan Coben, Gregg Hurwitz, David Baldacci, Orson Scott Card, Frank Herbert, Brian Herbert, Kevin J. Anderson, Joseph Finder, Tom De Haven, Stephen R. Donaldson, Nathaniel Philbrick, Terry Brooks, Steve Berry, Gene Wilder, Philip K. Dick, Dennis Lehane, Douglas J. Preston, Lincoln Child, Ayn Rand, Justin Cronin, Carl Hiaasen, Erik Larson, and Isaac Asimov, among others.

Early life
Brick studied acting and writing at UCLA before embarking on his professional career in 1989.

Career

Audiobooks

In 1999, Brick began narrating audiobooks and found himself a popular choice for top publishers and authors. After recording some 250 titles in five years, AudioFile magazine named Brick “one of the fastest-rising stars in the audiobook galaxy," and proclaimed him a "Golden Voice," a reputation solidified by a November 2004 article on the front page of the Wall Street Journal. Publishers Weekly then went on to honor Brick as Narrator of the Year in 2007 and 2011. To date, he has won over 50 Earphone Awards, two Audie Awards and a nomination for a Grammy Award.

He opened his own audiobook recording studio and publishing company, Brick By Brick Audiobooks, with the goals of streamlining production and ensuring consistency throughout his body of work. (Taking a note from DVDs, many of Brick By Brick's titles also include extra features, such as interviews and illustrations.) On May 16, 2008, Brick By Brick Audiobooks released its first title: Lord Foul's Bane, from Stephen R. Donaldson's The Chronicles of Thomas Covenant series. By April 4, 2009, Brick had narrated and released the other two titles in the initial trilogy (The Illearth War and The Power That Preserves), along with Fatal Revenant, the eighth book in the series. When completed, this debut project will result in new unabridged audio narrations of all 10 titles of The Chronicles of Thomas Covenant series. The first trilogy, The Chronicles of Thomas Covenant, the Unbeliever, was released in print from 1977 to 1979; The Second Chronicles of Thomas Covenant was released in print from 1980 to 1983; and The Last Chronicles of Thomas Covenant tetralogy was released in print and audio format from 2004 to 2013.

Brick By Brick Audiobooks has since grown to include the unabridged recordings of M. K. Wren's three-volume The Phoenix Legacy (Sword of the Lamb, Shadow of the Swan and House of the Wolf), as well as literary classics such as Mary Shelley's Frankenstein and Charles Dickens' A Christmas Carol. The CD version of the latter includes four audio discs, as well as a fifth disc of bonus material which includes the original 1843 First Edition illustrations by John Leech (caricaturist) and a photo of Brick playing the role of Ebenezer Scrooge in a 1995 stage production of A Christmas Carol.

In October 2009, Brick compiled and released Gothic Horror: Bloodcurdling Tales from the World’s Greatest Authors, a collection of short stories from famous authors such as Edgar Allan Poe, H.P. Lovecraft, Mary Shelley and more. In an innovative twist, every All Hallow’s Eve hence a new story by a new author will be added to the Gothic Horror library, giving listeners an ever-growing collection of classic horror on audio.

Brick cites as his favorite audiobook readings Philip K. Dick's Do Androids Dream of Electric Sheep? (released under the film adaptation's title, Blade Runner) and Budd Schulberg's What Makes Sammy Run? "I would have them back just so I could redo them year after year after year. Because they never get old for me."

Stage and cinema
Brick spent 10 years with the LA-based traveling Shakespeare troupe Will and Company, performing for schools throughout California. He has appeared as Cyrano, Hamlet, and Macbeth in productions throughout the country. In 2005, he collaborated with author Orson Scott Card to adapt a collection of the author’s short stories for the stage in a production titled Posing as People.

In 2008, Brick appeared in "The Delivery," a short film from Stefan Rudnicki, Gabrielle DeCuir and Skyboat Films starring Efrem Zimbalist, Jr., Michael York, John Rubinstein, Stephanie Zimbalist, Harlan Ellison and Orson Scott Card, among others. The Delivery won First Place in Fantasy at the 2008 Dragon*Con Independent Film Festival. The trailer for The Delivery can be viewed online. In 2010, Brick appeared as Agent Frank Donnolly in the independent film, Hit Parade, written and directed by comic book writer Joe Casey. The trailer for Hit Parade can be viewed online. The DVD can be purchased on Amazon or watched via Amazon Online.

Writing

In 2000, Brick was hired to adapt Arthur C. Clarke’s Rendezvous with Rama for the big screen by Morgan Freeman and Revelations Entertainment with David Fincher attached to direct.

Brick has written articles in a variety of comic book, science fiction and toy-related subjects for publications such as Wizard Magazine, ToyFare, Comics Buyer's Guide, Creative Screenwriting and others.

In 2012 Brick completed his first novel, a modern-day supernatural thriller based on an 18th-century murder in New England. He is also writing an instructional guide, Narrating Audiobooks by Scott Brick.

Awards and honors
AudioFile named Brick a Golden Voice narrator. In 2006, Publishers Weekly named him Narrator of the

Awards

"Best of" lists

Bestselling audiobooks

References

External links

 Scott Brick Presents - Primary Artist Site
 Scott Brick Presents - Online Sales Web Site
 Tantor Media Narrator Detail Page for Scott Brick
 Publishers Weekly 2007 Narrator of the Year Interview
 Audio File Magazine Golden Voice Interview and Audiography
 Video of Scott Brick reading Harlan Coben's novel THE WOODS
 Trailer for THE DELIVERY - a Short Film in which Scott Brick Appears

1966 births
Living people
Audiobook narrators
American male voice actors
Actors from Santa Barbara, California